Jordanita minutissima is a moth of the family Zygaenidae. It is found in the Saharan Atlas and the Aurès Mountains.

The length of the forewings is 6.5–7 mm for males and females. Adults are on wing from May to June.

The larvae probably feed on Carthamus or Echinops species.

References

C. M. Naumann, W. G. Tremewan: The Western Palaearctic Zygaenidae. Apollo Books, Stenstrup 1999, 

Procridinae
Moths described in 1916